Mario Costa Barberena (17 April 1934 – 16 December 2013) was a Brazilian paleontologist.

Biography 
He graduated in Natural History at the Pontifícia Universidade Católica do Rio Grande do Sul (Pontifical Catholic University of Rio Grande do Sul) in 1956 to 1959. He completed his doctorate at Harvard University, in Stratigraphic and Paleontology (1977–1978). He was lecturer at the Universidade Federal do Rio Grande do Sul (Federal University of Rio Grande do Sul) in 1974.

The genus Barberenachampsa is named after him. Has contributed considerably to the Geopark of Paleorrota.

References 

 Curriculum 1 (portuguese).
 Curriculum 2. (portuguese)
 Book Os Fascinantes Caminhos da Paleontologia. Author : Antônio Isaia. Publisher Pallotti. (Portuguese)
 Book: "Cronologia Histórica de Santa Maria e do extinto município de São Martinho." 1787–1933. Vol I. Author: Romeu Beltrão, Publisher Pallotti, 1958. (Portuguese)

Brazilian paleontologists
Harvard University alumni
1934 births
2013 deaths
Pontifical Catholic University of Rio Grande do Sul alumni